Hooker Municipal Airport  is a city-owned public-use airport located zero miles west of the central business district of Hooker, a city in Texas County, Oklahoma, United States.

Hooker Municipal Airport covers an area of 60 acres which contains one runway designated 17/35 with a 3,312 x 60 ft (1,009 x 18 m) asphalt surface.  For the 12-month period ending September 23, 2010, the airport had 1,000 aircraft operations, an average of 83 per month: 100% general aviation. At that time there were 10 aircraft based at this airport: 10 single-engine.

References

External links 
 

Airports in Oklahoma
Buildings and structures in Texas County, Oklahoma